Benguerra Island in Mozambique is the second largest island in the Bazaruto Archipelago, which broke away from the mainland thousands of years ago. The island is approximately 55 square kilometers (11km long x 5.5 km wide), and lies 14km offshore. Portuguese explorers also gave the island the name Santa Antonio. It is famous for its unspoiled white beaches, dive sites, luxury resorts, horseback riding and fishing.

Habitat

Benguerra Island comprises forest, savannah, freshwater lakes and wetland eco-systems that sustain a diverse population of fauna and flora. Fresh water crocodiles can be found in the three lakes, bearing testimony to the island's mainland past.  The island, which is home to approximately 140 bird species, was declared a National Park in 1971.

References

Bazaruto Archipelago
Islands of Mozambique